Claro Puerto Rico is one of the largest telecommunications services company in Puerto Rico. It is headquartered in Guaynabo, Puerto Rico, and has operated for almost a century offering voice, data, long distance, broadband, directory publishing and wireless services for the island residents and businesses. It was founded by the Behn brothers, Sosthenes and Hernan. Originally, Puerto Rico Telephone Company eventually spawned ITT Corporation, which was founded by Sosthenes Behn. The company was a public corporation of the government of Puerto Rico for many years until the majority stakes were acquired by GTE in the mid-1990s. It was a subsidiary of Verizon Communications until it was fully acquired by América Móvil in 2007.

Present Day

On April 3, 2006, Verizon Communications announced it had agreed to sell its stakes in Telecomunicaciones de Puerto Rico, Inc. (TELPRI) and their sole ownership of the main Dominican telephone company Verizon Dominicana, now Claro República Dominicana, to América Móvil of Mexico.

On December 31, 2006, Verizon and América Móvil completed Verizon Dominicana ownership transfer into Mexican hands. After another three months and various litigations upon the Federal Communications Commission, which had advise from the Puerto Rico Telecommunications Board, on March 30, 2007 TELPRI assets were completely acquired by América Móvil. The purchase was closed after an agreement to purchase from Popular, Inc., the government of Puerto Rico and the telephone company employee stock ownership program, the remaining stocks of TELPRI at the same price as Verizon.

Currently, América Móvil is the 100% owner of the company and has rebranded the wireless arm of the company -formerly Verizon Wireless- under their international Claro brand.

As of February 2011 America Móvil has rebranded its wireline (fixed line), broadband DSL, television and dial-up services as Claro. The only services that, for now, remain branded as Claro - Puerto Rico Telephone are business, government or corporate.

Effective March 2013, all Claro Puerto Rico have been rebranded. Services to business, government and enterprises are now offered under the Claro Empresas brand.

Relationship with Verizon Wireless
Until 2014, Claro continued to offer a CDMA network for Verizon Wireless customers as well as legacy Claro customers. The CDMA network appeared as "Extended Network" coverage on Verizon - meaning the majority of Verizon customers were able use it at no extra charge. Prepaid providers like Page Plus Cellular however had to pay roaming in Puerto Rico.

Data access for Verizon customers was at full speed. However, Claro deployed EV-DO before launching its GSM/UMTS network. As a result, Claro had the slowest CDMA coverage on Verizon Wireless at sub-3G 1xRTT speeds, peaking at 144-230 kbit/speed. Roaming customers would not access the EV-DO local network.

Data, like voice, was Extended Network coverage which had per-KB roaming charges on some older plans.

As of 2014, the former Verizon CDMA network has been shut down with Claro now using GSM, UMTS, and LTE exclusively. Verizon has since signed a 2G and 3G CDMA roaming agreement with Open Mobile, where Verizon customers can use its network without charge. Later on, Verizon has also signed another agreement with Claro to also allow customers use their LTE Network.

See also

List of United States telephone companies

References

External links
 Claro Puerto Rico
 América Móvil

Internet service providers of Puerto Rico
Telecommunications companies of Puerto Rico
ITT Inc.
América Móvil